The Graisupis is a river of  Kėdainiai district municipality, Kaunas County, central Lithuania.

It originates at the edge of the Krakės-Dotnuva forest nearby Palainiškiai, then flows to the southeast till it meets the Smilga (from the left side) nearby Lipliūnai. All the course is channalised. 

The name Graisupis possibly comes from Lithuanian verb greisti ('to become quicker').

References

Rivers of Lithuania
Kėdainiai District Municipality